The Whipple Mountains Wilderness is a  wilderness administered by the Bureau of Land Management (BLM). Most of the Whipple Mountains are within the wilderness area. It is located in the northeastern Colorado Desert near the Colorado River. The Parker Dam is  due east.

The western portion of the mountain range has pale green formations, differing from the eastern, steeply carved and striking brick-red volcanics.  Landforms are diverse and range from valley floors and washes to steep-walled canyons, domed peaks, natural bridges, and eroded spires.

The mountains mark a major direction change of the north-south Colorado, as it changes directions to southeast, then southwest around the eastern perimeter of the range.

Flora and fauna

The two major habitats here are the Sonoran xeric bush scrub with creosote bush, and Sonoran thorn forest with Velvet mesquite.  The dominant vegetation-type is commonly referred to creosote bush scrub, with palo verde, desert Ironwood, smoketree, and numerous species of cacti including cholla, saguaro, foxtail, and prickly pear.

Wildlife species include the desert bighorn sheep, mule deer, wild burro, coyote, black-tailed jackrabbit, ground squirrels, kangaroo rats, quail, roadrunners, owls, several species of rattlesnakes and lizards, and the threatened desert tortoise.  The Whipple Mountains provide superior nesting and foraging habitat for a number of raptors; including prairie falcon, golden eagle, red-tailed hawk, and Cooper's hawk.

Activities

To protect the fragile and rare habitats of the Whipples, wheeled and motorized vehicles are excluded from the entire wilderness area. Hiking and horseback riding are the primary means of accessing the interior of the range. The most frequently used route for these activities lies in Whipple Wash (see photo) which bisects the range from southwest to northeast. Motorized access to the boundary of the wilderness is possible only from the north-east by way of a power line access road. This road may require high-clearance or four-wheel-drive vehicles. No permit is required for individual access, but a permit is required by the BLM for commercial or organized group access.

Popular activities include hiking, horseback riding, hunting, camping, rock hounding, photography, and backpacking. Whipple Wash is a popular hiking location.

See also
 Whipple Mountains

References

 This article includes material in the public domain from the Bureau of Land Management.

External links
 
 

Wilderness areas of California
Protected areas of the Mojave Desert
Protected areas of the Colorado Desert
Protected areas of San Bernardino County, California
Wilderness areas within the Lower Colorado River Valley
Bureau of Land Management areas in California
Protected areas established in 1994
1994 establishments in California